Deborah Lynn Boardman (born 1974) is a United States district judge of the United States District Court for the District of Maryland and former United States magistrate judge of the same court.

Early life  and education 

Boardman was born in Silver Spring, Maryland, and grew up in Frederick, Maryland. Boardman has been described as being of Palestinian descent on her mother's side. She received her Bachelor of Arts, summa cum laude, from Villanova University in 1996 and her Juris Doctor from the University of Virginia School of Law in 2000. She was a Fulbright Scholar in Amman, Jordan.

Legal career 

Boardman began her career as a law clerk for Judge James C. Cacheris of the United States District Court for the Eastern District of Virginia from 2000 to 2001. From 2001 to 2008, she worked as an associate at Hogan & Hartson (now Hogan Lovells) in Washington, D.C. where she was selected to serve as the senior associate in the firm's pro bono department. From 2008 to 2019, she served at the Federal Public Defender's Office for the District of Maryland, including four years as the first assistant federal public defender.

Federal judicial service

United States magistrate judge service 

On September 23, 2019, Boardman was selected to be a United States magistrate judge of the District of Maryland. She was sworn into office on September 25, 2019. Her service as a magistrate judge was terminated when she was sworn in as a district court judge.

District court service 

On March 30, 2021, President Joe Biden announced his intent to nominate Boardman to serve as a United States district judge of the United States District Court for the District of Maryland. On April 19, 2021, her nomination was sent to the Senate. President Biden nominated Boardman to the seat vacated by Judge Richard D. Bennett, who had announced his intent to assume senior status upon the confirmation of his successor. On May 12, 2021, a hearing on her nomination was held before the Senate Judiciary Committee. On June 10, 2021, her nomination was reported out of committee by an 11–10 vote, with Senator Lindsey Graham voted "present". On June 23, 2021, the United States Senate invoked cloture on her nomination by a 52–48 vote. Her nomination was confirmed later that day by a 52–48 vote. She received her judicial commission on June 25, 2021. She was sworn in on July 1, 2021.

References

External links 
 
 

1974 births
Living people
21st-century American women lawyers
21st-century American lawyers
21st-century American judges
21st-century American women judges
American people of Palestinian descent
Judges of the United States District Court for the District of Maryland
People from Silver Spring, Maryland
People associated with Hogan Lovells
Public defenders
United States magistrate judges
United States district court judges appointed by Joe Biden
University of Virginia School of Law alumni
Villanova University alumni